East Cholderton is a hamlet in the civil parish of Amport in the Test Valley district of Hampshire, England. Its nearest town is Andover which lies approximately 4.5 miles (6.7 km) east from the village, just off the A303 road.

Notable residents
Lieutenant-General Sir John Elley MP KCB KCH KMT and KSG (1764 - 1839), a cavalry officer who fought with distinction in the Napoleonic Wars, lived and died at Cholderton Lodge.

Villages in Hampshire
Test Valley